Hirehonnihalli is a village in Dharwad district of Karnataka, India.

Demographics 
As of the 2011 Census of India there were 1,137 households in Hirehonnihalli and a total population of 5,345 consisting of 2,789 males and 2,556 females. There were 712 children ages 0-6.

References

Villages in Dharwad district